Talebi is an Iranian surname. Notable people with the surname include:

 Aboutaleb Talebi, Iranian wrestler
 Farshid Talebi, Iranian footballer
 Jalal Talebi, Iranian footballer
 Niloufar Talebi, American author, literary translator, multidisciplinary artist

See also 
  Hamid Aboutalebi, Iranian diplomat

Iranian-language surnames